Aktash, which means 'white rock' in many Turkic languages, may refer to:
Aktash (river), a river in the Republic of Dagestan, Russia
Ak-Tash (disambiguation), several villages in Kyrgyzstan
Aktash, Russia, several rural localities in Russia
Aktash Massif Important Bird Area, Tajikistan
Aktashite, a mineral 
Oqtosh, a town in the Narpay District, Uzbekistan
Oqtosh, Namangan Region, a town in the Toʻraqoʻrgʻon District, Uzbekistan

See also
Aktaş (disambiguation)